Sperry is a surname. Notable people with the surname include:

Armstrong Sperry (1897–1976), American author and illustrator
Brett Sperry (contemporary), American video game designer
Carlos A. Sperry, Democratic President of the West Virginia Senate from Greenbrier County, served 1872–1872
Charles Stillman Sperry (1847–1911), an officer in the United States Navy
Chris Sperry (born 1965), American college baseball coach
Elmer Ambrose Sperry (1860–1930), American inventor and entrepreneur, founder of Sperry Gyroscope Company, father of Lawrence Sperry
E. Frank Sperry (1843–1916), Mayor of Orlando
James Sperry (1910–1997), English cricketer
John Sperry (1924–2012), Anglican Bishop
Joseph Evans Sperry (1854–1930), American architect
Lawrence Sperry (1892–c. 1923), American aviation pioneer, son of Elmer Ambrose Sperry
Lewis Sperry (1848–1922), United States Representative from Connecticut
Mário Sperry (born 1966), Brazilian martial artist
Nehemiah D. Sperry (1827–1911), United States Representative from Connecticut
Neil Sperry, Texas gardening and horticulture expert
Paul A. Sperry (1895–1982), American inventor and businessman, founder of Sperry Top-Sider
Roger Wolcott Sperry (1913–1994), American neurobiologist, psychologist and Nobel laureate
Thomas Sperry (c. 1864 – 1913), American businessman and co-founder of S&H Green Stamps
William Miller Sperry, namesake of William Miller Sperry Observatory, brother of Thomas Sperry